These are the rosters of all participating teams at the women's water polo tournament at the 2017 World Aquatics Championships in Budapest, Hungary.

Group A

The following is the Italian roster in the women's water polo tournament of the 2017 World Aquatics Championships.

Head coach: Fabio Conti

The following is the Brazilian roster in the women's water polo tournament of the 2017 World Aquatics Championships.

Head coach: Eduardo Abla

The following is the Canadian roster in the women's water polo tournament of the 2017 World Aquatics Championships.

Head coach:  Haris Pavlidis

The following is the Chinese roster in the women's water polo tournament of the 2017 World Aquatics Championships.

Head coach: Gong Dali

Group B

The following is the New Zealand roster in the women's water polo tournament of the 2017 World Aquatics Championships.

Head coach: Angela Winstanley-Smith

The following is the South Africa roster in the women's water polo tournament of the 2017 World Aquatics Championships.

Head coach: Samuel Gareth

The following is the Spanish roster in the women's water polo tournament of the 2017 World Aquatics Championships.

Head coach: Miguel Oca Gaia

The following is the United States roster in the women's water polo tournament of the 2017 World Aquatics Championships.

Head coach: Adam Krikorian

Group C

The following is the Japanese roster in the women's water polo tournament of the 2017 World Aquatics Championships.

Head coach: Hideo Katho

The following is the Dutch roster in the women's water polo tournament of the 2017 World Aquatics Championships.

Head coach: Arno Havenga

The following is the Japanese roster in the women's water polo tournament of the 2017 World Aquatics Championships.

Head coach: Attila Biro

The following is the French roster in the women's water polo tournament of the 2017 World Aquatics Championships.

Head coach: Florian Bruzzo

Group D

Greece 
The following is the  Greece roster.

Head coach: Georgios Morfesis

Australia
The following is the Australia roster.

Head coach: Athansios Kechagias

Russia 
The following is the Russia roster.

Head coach: Alexander Gaidukov

Kazakhstan
The following is the Kazakhstan roster.

Head coach: Andrey Sazykin

References

External links
Official website
Records and statistics (reports by Omega)

World Aquatics Championships water polo squads
Women's team rosters
2017 in women's water polo